Richard Arthur Field  is a city-owned public-use airport located three nautical miles (4 mi, 6 km) northeast of the central business district of Fayette, a city in Fayette County, Alabama, United States.

This airport is included in the FAA's National Plan of Integrated Airport Systems for 2011–2015 and 2009–2013, both of which categorized it as a general aviation facility.

Facilities and aircraft 
Richard Arthur Field covers an area of 150 acres (61 ha) at an elevation of 357 feet (109 m) above mean sea level. It has one runway designated 18/36 with an asphalt surface measuring 5,008 by 80 feet (1,526 x 24 m).

For the 12-month period ending October 1, 2010, the airport had 15,300 general aviation aircraft operations, an average of 41 per day. At that time there were 8 aircraft based at this airport, all single-engine.

See also 
 List of airports in Alabama

References

External links 
 Aerial image as of 5 February 1999 from USGS The National Map
 

Airports in Alabama
Buildings and structures in Fayette County, Alabama
Transportation in Fayette County, Alabama